Sohawa–Chakwal Road  (Punjabi) is a provincially maintained highway in Punjab that extends from Sohawa to Chakwal. The route is generally rural, passing through Chakwal, Jhelum and Rawalpindi districts of Punjab. The eastern terminus ends in Sohawa at the N-5 National Highway (Chakwal Chowk) while the western terminus ends at Tehsil Chowk in Chakwal with Talagang-Chakwal Road, Mandra Chakwal Road and Chakwal-Jhelum Road. Reconstruction of the road began on 6 September 2012 to convert the road to a dual carriageway. Construction was scheduled for completion in 2014, but has been on hold .

References

Highways in Punjab
Roads in Punjab, Pakistan
Chakwal District